Demet Müftüoğlu Eşeli (born 1974) is a Curator, Creative Director and the co-founder of ISTANBUL’74. Since 2010, she has been the Creative Head of Istanbul International Arts & Culture Festival (IST. FESTIVAL)  which she co-founded with Alphan Eşeli.

Background & Early Life
Demet Müftüoğlu-Eşeli studied Business Administration at Bilkent University, followed by a move to New York where she studied at the Fashion Institute of Technology.

Between 2000-2012, Müftüoğlu Eşeli has worked as a creative consultant at the Vakko. In 2000, she conceptualized and developed Turkey’s first multi-brand concept store V2K Designers. 
 
In 2007, she has collaborated with Grand Classics to present a film screening ceremony hosted by Daniel Day-Lewis and organized the International Herald Tribune Luxury Conference held in Istanbul and hosted by Suzy Menkes. 
 
In 2010, she commissioned Rex Architecture P.C. in New York to create the new Vakko HQ building.

ISTANBUL’74 and Career
In 2009, Müftüoğlu-Eşeli co-founded ISTANBUL'74 with her husband Alphan Eşeli, an independent platform that has been organizing cultural events festivals, exhibitions and artistic collaborations with creative thought leaders from around the world. ISTANBUL’74 has collaborated with leading international galleries such as Lehmann Maupin Gagosian
, Hauser and Wirth as well as designers and artists including Sandro Kopp Tracy Emin, Alex Prager, Angel Otero, Robin Rhode, JR, Idris Khan, Jonah Freeman & Justin Lowe, José Parlá, Inez & Vinoodh, Anton Corbijn, Defne Koz, Kezban Arca Batıbeki, Mehmet Ali Uysal, Diana Al-Hadid, Delfina Delettrez, André Saraiva, Robert Montgomery Stephen Jones, Sandro Kopp, Waris Ahluwalia amongst others.
 
The same year, Müftüoğlu-Eşeli established ‘74STUDIO Creative Agency.
 
In 2010, Müftüoğlu-Eşeli co-founded the Istanbul International Arts and Culture Festival, (IST. Festival) with Alphan Eşeli It is an annual, three-day festival that offers a hybrid program of panels and talks, exhibitions, workshops, screenings, and performances that aim to establish and forge cultural and artistic relations, by bringing together some of the world's most talented and creative minds.
 
In 2020, Müftüoğlu-Eşeli founded ‘74ESCAPE Gallery & Store, a shop for handmade ceramics.

References

1974 births
Living people
Turkish fashion
Businesspeople from Istanbul